Dallas Reid (born April 5, 1993) is an American voice actor affiliated with Funimation. They debuted in 2013, with their first lead role in 2015 with Kimito Kagurazaka in Shomin Sample. Other major roles include Asta in Black Clover, Haruki Bando in Cheer Boys!!, and Zack (Isaac Foster) in Angels of Death.

Filmography

Anime

Films

Video games

Notes

References

External links 
 
 

1993 births
21st-century American actors
American non-binary actors
American video game actors
American voice actors
Living people